REGLEG, or the Conference of European Regions with Legislative Power, is a political network of country subdivisions (regions) in European Union states. It consists of representatives of regional governments. It is not a formal EU institution, and only 73 regions of 8 member states participate.

 All 9 states of the federal republic of Austria
 All 5 regions and communities of the federal kingdom of Belgium
 Åland, an autonomous region of Finland
 All 16 states of the federal republic of Germany
 All 20 regions of Italy
 The two autonomous regions of Portugal: the Azores and Madeira
 All 17 autonomous communities of Spain
 Northern Ireland, Scotland and Wales, the three countries of the United Kingdom with devolved power

See also 
 Committee of the Regions

External links 
 regleg.eu

Regions of Europe